King Weilie of Zhou, personal name Jī Wǔ, was the thirty-second king of the Chinese Zhou dynasty and the twentieth of the Eastern Zhou.

His reign started in 425 BC, after his father King Kao of Zhou had died and lasted until his death in 402 BC.

He officially established three breakaway provinces of Jin (Hán, Wèi and Zhào) as feudal states, to act as a buffer between his royal domain and Qin (nominally one of his subject states). 

King Weilie fathered his successor King An of Zhou.

Family
Sons:
 Prince Jiao (d. 376 BC), ruled as King An of Zhou from 401–376 BC

Ancestry

See also
Family tree of ancient Chinese emperors

References 

402 BC deaths
Zhou dynasty kings
5th-century BC Chinese monarchs
Year of birth unknown